Football Federation of Sumshchyna is a football governing body in the region of Sumy Oblast, Ukraine. The federation is a member of the Football Federation of Ukraine.

The regional championships and cup competitions are officially conducted since 1952.

The first mentioning of football game on territory of Sumy Oblast is traced to 1916 when the local daily newspaper "Sumskyi Visnyk" (Sumy Herald) on 25 May 1916 published an article about a tournament or collection of exhibition games where local team of Slavia played against some weaker local teams. On 1 June 1916 the same newspaper published an article about another game of Slavia against visiting Feniks from Kharkiv where the local team was victorious 4:3. The article also mentioned that Slavia played against another Kharkiv team in 1915. At that time Sumy Oblast did not exist and its territory was part of Chernigov Governorate and Kharkov Governorate.

There is information that football regional championships were conducted as soon as there was created Sumy Oblast in 1939. However, there is not enough information available about earlier championships.

Previous Champions

1952    Mashynobudivnyk Sumy (1)
1953    Torpedo Sumy (1)
1954    Torpedo Sumy (2)
1955    Khimik Shostka (1)
1956    Nasosnyk Sumy (1)
1957    Burevisnyk Shostka (1)
1958    Nasosnyk Sumy (2)
1959    Avanhard Shostka (1)
1960    Avanhard Konotop (1)
1961    Ekran Shostka (1)
1962    SVADKU Sumy (1)
1963    Torpedo Sumy (3)
1964    Elektron Romny (1)
1965    Ekran Shostka (2)
1966    Kharchovyk Sumy (1)
1967    Kharchovyk Sumy (2)
1968    Shakhtar Konotop (1)
1969    Kharchovyk Sumy (3)
1970    SVADKU Sumy (2)
1971    Frunzenets Sumy (1)
1972    Frunzenets Sumy (2)
1973    Frunzenets Sumy (3)
1974    Svema Shostka (1)
1975    Frunzenets Sumy (4)
1976    Elektron Romny (2)
1977    Frunzenets Sumy (5)
1978    Frunzenets Sumy (6)
1979    Frunzenets Sumy (7)
1980    Frunzenets Sumy (8)
1981    Frunzenets Sumy (9)
1982    Lyvarnyk Sumy (1)
1983    Spartak Okhtyrka (1)
1984    Yavir Krasnopillya (1)
1985    Frunzenets Sumy (10)
1986    Avtomobilist Sumy (1)
1987    Frunzenets Sumy (11)
1988    FC Mayak Sumy (1)
1989    Frunzenets Sumy (12)
1990    Avtomobilist Sumy (2)
1991    Viktoriya Lebedyn (1)
1992    Syrzavod Hlukhiv (1)
1993    Spartak Okhtyrka (2)
1994    Svema Shostka (2)
1995    FC Shostka (3)
1995-96 Elektron Romny (3)
1996-97 Kharchovyk Popivka (1)
1997-98 Naftovyk-2 Okhtyrka (1)
1998-99 Frunzenets Sumy (13)
2000    Elektron-2 Romny (1)
2001    Shakhtar Konotop (2)
2002    Naftovyk-2 Okhtyrka (2)
2003    Naftovyk-2 Okhtyrka (3)
2004    Shakhtar Konotop (3)
2005    Naftovyk-2 Okhtyrka (4)
2006    Shakhtar Konotop (4)
2007    Shakhtar Konotop (5)
2008    Naftovyk-2 Okhtyrka (5)
2009    Shakhtar Konotop (6)
2010    ONPR–Ukrnafta Okhtyrka (6)
2011    FC Druzhba(1)
2012    Shakhtar Konotop (7)
2013    ONPR–Ukrnafta Okhtyrka (7)
2014    Ahrobiznes TSK Romny (1)
2015    Ahrobiznes TSK Romny (2)
2016    Ahrobiznes TSK Romny (3)
2017    Ahrobiznes TSK Romny (4)
2018    Alians Lypova Dolyna (1)
2019    LS Group Verkhnya Syrovatka (1)
2020    Trostianets (1)

Top winners
13 – Frunzenets Sumy
 9 – ONPR–Ukrnafta (Naftovyk-2) Okhtyrka 
 7 – Shakhtar Konotop 
 4 – Elektron Romny (including Elektron-2)
 4 – Ahrobiznes TSK Romny 
 3 – 3 clubs (Torpedo, Kharchovyk S., (Svema) Shostka)
 2 – 4 clubs (Nasosnyk, Ekran, SVADKU, Avtomobilist)
 1 – 14 clubs

Professional clubs
 FC Dynamo Sumy, 1946
 FC Frunzenets-Liha-99 Sumy (Avangard, Spartak), 1960-1967

See also
 FFU Council of Regions

References

External links
 Official website. Football Federation of Sumshchyna

Football in the regions of Ukraine
Football governing bodies in Ukraine
Sport in Sumy Oblast